Kuhin (also Romanized as Kūhīn) is a village in Bazarjan Rural District  in the Central District of Tafresh County, Markazi Province, Iran. As of the 2006 census, Kuhin had a population of 231 residents, contained within 92 families.

Coverage of mobile antennas
MCI's Antenna has been launched in 2010 in the village. Now is good coverage in rural areas. But outside of the village does not have enough coverage.

References 

Populated places in Tafresh County